David Gleirscher (born 23 July 1994) is an Austrian luger. He competed for Austria in the 2015–16 Luge World Cup in the men's singles and finished tenth in the points standings. In men's luge at the 2018 Winter Olympics he became a surprise champion after the favorite, Felix Loch, made a mistake in the last run and dropped out of the medals. Before the Olympic win, Gleirscher did not have a single World Cup podium appearance.

Family
David Gleirscher's father, Gerhard, was a luger who won three world championship medals, including both gold in the team event and a bronze in the men's single event in 1997. His father also competed in three Winter Olympics, finish seventh in each Olympics (Singles: 1994, 1998; Doubles: 1992).

His younger brother Nico Gleirscher is also a luger competing for Austria.  Nico placed third in the sprint event at Winterberg during the 2017-18 Luge World Cup.

References

External links

1994 births
Living people
Austrian male lugers
Olympic lugers of Austria
Olympic gold medalists for Austria
Olympic bronze medalists for Austria
Olympic medalists in luge
Lugers at the 2018 Winter Olympics
Lugers at the 2022 Winter Olympics
Medalists at the 2018 Winter Olympics
People from Hall in Tirol
Lugers at the 2012 Winter Youth Olympics
Sportspeople from Tyrol (state)